Foofur is an American traditionally animated children's television series from Kissyfur creator Phil Mendez that was produced by Hanna-Barbera Productions with SEPP International S.A. Airing on NBC from 1986 to 1988, the show was about the everyday misadventures of the skinny blue protagonist dog in Willowby. A comic book series based on the cartoon was produced by and released from Star Comics (an imprint of Marvel Comics).

Plot
In the town of Willowby, a tall skinny blue bloodhound named Foofur has taken refuge in a mansion, in 32 Maple Street, which is also his birthplace. In Foofur's group is his niece Rocki, Fencer the Cat, a bulldog named Louis with his girlfriend, an Old English Sheepdog named Annabell, and a cocker spaniel named Hazel with her husband, a miniature schnauzer named Fritz-Carlos.

Foofur and his friends, however, have an enemy in a woman named Mrs. Amelia Escrow and her pet Chihuahua named Pepe, who tries to expose Foofur's illegal roommates – but always to no avail. Mrs. Escrow has tried many times to sell the estate, but unbeknownst to her, Foofur and his friends keep the house from being bought, as they also protect their home from rodents like the Rat Brothers who tend to mess with Fencer, other cats like Vinnie and his Cat Pack, and greedy humans.

While trying to stop Mrs. Escrow, Foofur tries to avoid having his friends captured by the Bowser Busters' dog catchers Mel and Harvey. In addition, an Afghan Hound named Burt also antagonizes Foofur and competes with him to win the affection of a basset hound named Dolly.

Characters

Main characters
 Foofur (voiced by Frank Welker) - a blue bloodhound who has taken refuge in a mansion, at 32 Maple Street, which is also his birthplace.
 Rocki (voiced by Christina Lange) - an indigo bloodhound puppy and Foofur's niece.
 Louis (voiced by Dick Gautier) - a street-smart bulldog.
 Annabell (voiced by Susan Tolsky) - a sensitive Old English Sheepdog and Louis' girlfriend.
 Hazel (voiced by Pat Carroll) - a cocker spaniel and Fritz-Carlos' wife.
 Fritz-Carlos (voiced by Jonathan Schmock) - a miniature schnauzer and Hazel's husband.
 Fencer (voiced by Eugene Williams) - a cat with a penchant for the martial arts.
 Mrs. Amelia Escrow (voiced by Susan Silo) - a woman who has tried many times to sell the mansion. Unbeknownst to her, Foofur and his friends keep the house from being bought.
 Pepe (voiced by Don Messick) - Mrs. Amelia Escrow's chihuahua who tries to expose Foofur and his roommates, to no avail.
 Rat Brothers - three rats who antagonize Fencer.
 Sammy (voiced by Chick Vennera) - a thin black rat who is the leader of the Rat Brothers.
 Baby (voiced by Peter Cullen) - a fat violet rat.
 Chucky (voiced by Allan Melvin in most episodes, and by Frank Welker in a few episodes) - a fat pink rat who is the strongest of the Rat Brothers.
 Mel and Harvey (voiced by David Doyle and Michael Bell) - the Bowser Busters' dog catchers.
 Vinnie (voiced by Peter Cullen) - leader of a cat gang and one of the enemies of Foofur and his friends.
 Burt (voiced by William Callaway) - an arrogant Afghan Hound who tries to win Dolly's love.
 Dolly (voiced by Susan Blu) - a basset hound who is the object of Foofur and Burt's affections.

Other characters
 Norris - a beagle puppy who is also a mascot for a dog food company.
 Bertie and Bernie - two beagles belonging to a judge.
 Harry - an easily scared dog.
 Pam - a Pekingese.
 Celia - a poodle.
 Brenda - a terrier.
 Brigette - a poodle who belongs to Mrs. Escrow's cousin Roberto.
 Lucy - a poodle who lives in a pawn shop.
 Muffy - a poodle.
 Jojo - a Scottish Terrier.
 Sarge - a Doberman Pinscher.
 Dobkins - a St. Bernard.
 Trendy - a Siberian Husky.
 Blaze - a German Shepherd.
 Lorenzo - a dalmatian.
 Otto - a Labrador Retriever.
 Rover Cleveland - an elderly dog.
 Tugboat - Foofur's brother and Rocki's father.
 Phyllis - Foofur's sister.
 Obscura - a cat belonging to a fortune teller.
 Cleo - a violet cat belonging to an archaeologist.
 Willy - a fox kit, trying to avoid the fox hunters.
 Duke - a singing mouse.
 Killer (voiced by Jerry Houser) - a harmless St. Bernard.
 Brisbane - a dog.
 Big Boombah - a rat and the leader of the Shipyard Rats who is an opportunist.
 Pops - a rat who lives in the Willowby Train Station.
 Buttercup - Mrs. Escrow's pet canary.
 Mr. Mutton - a smuggler of London.
 Kirk-Hazel's old boyfriend, a German Shepherd trained for fire rescues who saves Fritz-Carlos and Rocki's playmate Augie when they're trapped in a burning house.
 Augie - another local dog, Rocki's playmate.
 Ivan - a Russian dog Foofur and Louis interact with in New York City.
 Lulubelle - a female dog initially intended to smuggle jewels, who was replaced by Annabelle.
 Oliver - an English puppy whom Annabelle saves after she ends up in London.

Voice cast

 Frank Welker – Foofur, Chucky (in some episodes)
 Michael Bell – Harvey
 Susan Blu – Dolly
 William Callaway – Burt
 Pat Carroll – Hazel
 Peter Cullen – Baby, Vinnie
 David Doyle – Mel
 Dick Gautier – Louis
 Christina Lange – Rocki
 Allan Melvin – Chucky
 Don Messick – Pepe
 Jonathan Schmock – Fritz Carlos
 Susan Silo – Mrs. Escrow
 Susan Tolsky – Annabell
 Chick Vennera – Sam
 Eugene Williams – Fencer

Additional voices

 David Ackroyd (Season 2) 
 Jered Barclay (Season 1) 
 Roscoe Lee Browne (Season 2) 
 Arthur Burghardt (Season 1) 
 Hamilton Camp 
 Victoria Carroll (Season 1) 
 Cheryl Chase (Season 2) 
 Danny Cooksey (Season 1) - Bogey (in "The Last Resort")
 Jim Cummings (Season 2) 
 Linda Dangcil (Season 1) 
 Jennifer Darling 
 Leo DeLyon (Season 2) 
 Walker Edmiston (Season 2) 
 Casey Ellison (Season 1) 
 John Erwin (Season 1) 
 Miriam Flynn 
 June Foray (Season 1) 
 George Furth (Season 2) 
 Melanie Gaffin (Season 1)
 Henry Gibson (Season 2) 
 Scott Grimes (Season 2) 
 Edan Gross (Season 2) 
 Jonathan Harris – Lance Lyons
 Phil Hartman (Season 2) 
 Jerry Houser (Season 2) – Killer the St. Bernard (in "Pepe's Pet Peeve")
 Vincent Howard (Season 2)
 Arte Johnson (Season 1) 
 Aron Kincaid (Season 2) 
 Keland Love (Season 1) 
 Allan Lurie (Season 2) 
 Jim MacGeorge (Season 2) 
 Robert Mandan (Season 2) 
 Kenneth Mars (Season 1) 
 Terrence McGovern (Season 2) 
 Brian Stokes Mitchell (Season 2) 
 Pedro Montero (Season 1) 
 Lynne Moody 
 Pat Musick (Season 2) 
 Frank Nelson (Season 1) – Dr. Pavlov (in "A Little Off the Top")
 Louis Nye (Season 2) 
 Nicholas Omana (Season 1) 
 Rob Paulsen (Season 2) 
 Josh Rodine (Season 1) 
 Percy Rodrigues (Season 2) 
 Kath Soucie (Season 2, uncredited)
 Alexandra Stoddart (Season 2) 
 Larry Storch (Season 2) 
 Mark L. Taylor (Season 1) 
 Sal Viscuso (Season 2)
 B.J. Ward (Season 2) 
 Lennie Weinrib (Season 2)

Episode list

Season 1 (1986)

Season 2 (1987–88)

Home media
In the late 1980s and early 1990s, a number of episodes of the series were released on VHS in the United States by Celebrity Home Entertainment's Just for Kids label.

Legal activity
Foofur played a role in the case Nationwide Insurance v. Board of Trustees of the University of Illinois, 116 F.3d 1154 (7th Cir. 1997). The case dealt with an insurer's duty to defend an insured party in light of the insured's intentional acts of property damage. The insured, a drunken college student, spelled out "FOO"—meaning "foo", a word derived from Foofur—on the artificial turf football field of Memorial Stadium with lighter fluid burning the letters into the turf. He caused $600,000 damage to the AstroTurf. The court held that such an act was not within the insurance policy's liability coverage.

Reception
In 2014, listing it among twelve 1980s animated series that supposedly did not deserve remembrance, io9 criticized the series, perceiving its premise to be contrived and remarking that "someone had the gall to think this was 'cool'".

References

External links

 
  Foofur at the Cartoon Scrapbook
  Foofur at the Big Cartoon Database
  William Hanna: The Story of a Legend
  Foofur at Don Markstein's Toonopedia. Archived from the original on July 30, 2016.

1980s American animated television series
1980s American children's comedy television series
1986 American television series debuts
1988 American television series endings
American children's animated adventure television series
American children's animated comedy television series
Television shows adapted into comics
Star Comics titles
English-language television shows
NBC original programming
Animated television series about dogs
Animated television series about cats
Animated television series about mice and rats
Talking animals in fiction
Works about friendship
Television shows set in the United States
Television series set in the 1980s
Television series by Hanna-Barbera